The 12th Panzer Division was an armoured division in the German Army, established in 1940.

In October 1940 the 2nd Motorised Infantry Division was reorganized as the 12th Panzer Division, and in June 1941 it joined Operation Barbarossa, fighting in the battles of Minsk and Smolensk. It fought the rest of the war on the Eastern Front and surrendered to the Red Army in the Courland Pocket in May 1945.

History

The division was formed from the 2nd Infantry Division, itself formed in 1921. The division was motorised in 1936–37 and participated in the invasions of Poland and France. It was reorganised as a Panzer Division in October 1940.

The 12th Panzer Division participated in Operation Barbarossa, taking part in the drive towards Leningrad. Suffering heavy casualties during the Soviet counter offensive in the winter of 1941–42, the division was withdrawn to Estonia for a refit. It remained with Army Group North for the most part of the war except for a brief spell south while participating in the battle of Kursk in July 1943 and the following defensive operations and retreat after the German failure. The division returned to the northern sector in January 1944 but came too late to play any role in the unsuccessful German efforts to prevent the Siege of Leningrad from being broken by the Red Army. It was eventually entrapped in the Courland Pocket after the successful Soviet offensive in July 1944, Operation Bagration. It remained in Courland where it surrendered to Soviet forces in May 1945.

Organization 
Structure of the division through its history:
 Headquarters
 29th Panzer Regiment
 5th Panzergrenadier Regiment
 25th Panzergrenadier Regiment
 2nd Panzer Artillery Regiment
 22nd Motorcycle Battalion (later became 2nd Panzer Reconnaissance Battalion)
 508th Tank Destroyer Battalion
 303rd Army Anti-Aircraft Battalion (later added in 1942)
 2nd Divisional Supply Group

Commanding officers
The commanders of the division:
Lieutenant general Fedor von Bock, 1931
Major General/Lieutenant General Hubert Gerke, 1 October 1934
Major General/Lieutenant General Paul Bader, 1 April 1937
Generaloberst Josef Harpe, 5 October 1940
Generalleutnant Walter Wessel, 15 January 1942
Generalleutnant Erpo Freiherr von Bodenhausen, 1 March 1943
Generalmajor Gerhard Müller, 28 May 1944
Generalleutnant Erpo Freiherr von Bodenhausen, 16 July 1944
Oberst Horst von Usedom, 12 April 1945

See also 
Organisation of a SS Panzer Division
Panzer division

References

Bibliography

 

 
 
 

1*12
Military units and formations established in 1941
1934 establishments in Germany
Military units and formations disestablished in 1945